Kaleidoscope is a 2016 British thriller film directed by Rupert Jones. The film premiered at the 2016 Chicago International Film Festival. On review aggregator Rotten Tomatoes, the film holds an approval rating of 62% based on 21 reviews, with an average rating of 6.46/10. On Metacritic, the film has a weighted average score of 52 out of 100, based on 8 critics, indicating "generally favorable reviews".

Cast 
 Toby Jones as Carl
 Anne Reid as Aileen
 Sinead Matthews as Abby
 Deborah Findlay as Maureen

References

External links 

2016 thriller films
British thriller films
2010s English-language films
2010s British films